Collin Hansen (born April 7, 1981) is an American journalist who serves as vice president for content and editor in chief for the Gospel Coalition. He is best known for his writing on the New Calvinism, and he hosts the Gospelbound podcast.

Biography and education
Hansen is from Chester, South Dakota. He received an undergraduate degree in history and journalism from Northwestern University. He earned a Master of Divinity from Trinity Evangelical Divinity School.
Prior to working for the Gospel Coalition, Hansen was an associate editor for Christianity Today.
He lives with his wife and children in Birmingham, Alabama, and serves on the advisory board of Beeson Divinity School. He is the founder of the Shelby Foote Society.

New Calvinism
Hansen is considered an expert on the New Calvinism, a term that was coined for the title of his 2008 book Young, Restless, Reformed: A Journalist's Journey With the New Calvinists. He has been quoted on the movement by Time and The New York Times.

Books
Young, Restless, Reformed: A Journalist's Journey With the New Calvinists 
A God-Sized Vision: Revival Stories That Stretch and Stir (coauthor with John D. Woodbridge) 
Four Views on the Spectrum of Evangelicalism (coeditor with Andrew Naselli) 
Blind Spots: Becoming a Courageous, Compassionate, and Commissioned Church 
Gospelbound: Living with Resolute Hope in an Anxious Age  (coauthored with Sarah Eekhoff Zylstra) 
Rediscover Church: Why the Body of Christ is Essential (coauthored with Jonathan Leeman) 
Timothy Keller: His Spiritual and Intellectual Formation

References

1981 births
Living people
American male journalists
Evangelical writers
Writers from Birmingham, Alabama
Northwestern University alumni
Trinity Evangelical Divinity School alumni
Journalists from Alabama
Medill School of Journalism alumni